Vision DJ (born 8 April 1987), known in private life as Francis Essah Aboagye, is a Ghanaian radio, event, artist DJ and singer who co-host the "Ryse ‘n Shyne" at Y107.9FM.

Career

Beginning 
Francis Essah Aboagye was born on 8 April 1987 in Accra. At age 18 years old, Vision started his deejay days during his secondary school years at Koforidua Senior High Technical School. Following completion, he attended Central University College in Tema, where he was a banking and finance graduate. He continued pursuing his career in the music industry throughout college, and played on Vibe FM(now Life FM) from 2007 to 2009, before joining YFM.

Music career
Vision DJ released one of his singles in the latter part of November 2016. Entitled Grind which features A.I., the single enjoyed massive airplay after its release, which brought him into the music limelight.

Concerts and Radio
Vision has shared platforms playing at 020live concerts and in the VIP ‘Red Room’ at the Vodafone Ghana Music Awards. Vision DJ has shared the stage with the likes of Trey Songz, Ludacris, Fabolous, Red Cafe, D’banj, Neato C, Ice Prince and WizKid as DJ. In 2013, he was an In house Dj at the Big Brother Africa event. He is the official DJ for dancehall act Kaakie.

Since 2009, Vision has rocked the weekly morning drive with Ms Naa on Y107.9FM's Ryse ‘n Shyne. His famous ‘Loud ‘n Lyve’ mixes kept his listeners locked in every morning.

Major concerts
‘Wave Club Tour’ with Joey B and Pappy Kojo (WAVE Concert- 2017)
Christmas Show (Dejavu Night Club, Liberia -2012)
Harare International Festival of Arts (Zimbabwe – 2015)
 HIFA Music Festival in Zimbabwe
Zambia International trade fair  (Ndola, Zambia  – 2015)

Awards and nominations

Ghana DJ Awards

Awards

|-

|-
|rowspan="1"|2013
|rowspan="1"|Himself
|Discovery DJ of the Year
|
|-
|rowspan="1"|2017
|rowspan="1"|Himself
|Best DJ and Artist Collaboration of the Year
|
|-
|rowspan="1"|2017
|rowspan="1"|Himself
|DJ Song of the Year – Grind
|
|-

Vodafone Ghana Music Awards

|-
|rowspan="1"|2017
|rowspan="1"|Himself
|Afropop Song of the Year-Grind
|
|-

Ghana Music Honours

|-
|rowspan="1"|2017
|rowspan="1"|Himself
|Best DJ Honour
|
|-

Ghana Entertainment Awards

|-
|rowspan="1"|2017
|rowspan="1"|Himself
|Best DJ of the Year
|
|-

Discography

Major singles
 Wobeba featuring EL     Produced by Guilty Beatz
 This Year featuring Mr Eazi Produced by Otee Beatz
 Grind featuring A.I Produced by Otee Beatz
 Double Trouble featuring Sarkodie and King Promise Produced by Kuvie
 Like December featuring Samini Produced by Juls
 Chuku featuring VVIP & Miyaki Produced by Guilty Beatz

Videography

References

External links 
 Vision DJ Official Website
 Vision DJ Twitter
 Vision DJ Soundcloud

Living people
Ghanaian musicians
People from Accra
1987 births
Koforidua Senior High Technical School alumni